Aleksander Semkowicz (born 7 February 1850 in Lwów, d. 2 April 1923 in Lwów) was a Polish historian, archivist, professor of Jan Kazimierz University in Lwów, correspondent member of Polish Academy of Learning. He was also editor-in-chief of "Kwartalnik Historyczny".

Around 1876 he was married to Maria Schier. They had four children: Władysław, a historian, Adam (b. 1880), Maria (b. 1882) and Zofia (b. 1888).

Bibliography
Polski Słownik Biograficzny, Vol. 36, 1996-1997.

20th-century Polish historians
Polish male non-fiction writers
1850 births
1923 deaths
Academic staff of the University of Lviv
People from the Kingdom of Galicia and Lodomeria
Polish Austro-Hungarians
Burials at Lychakiv Cemetery
19th-century Polish historians